The 2018 Sparkassen Open was a professional tennis tournament played on clay courts. It was the 25th edition of the tournament which was part of the 2018 ATP Challenger Tour. It took place in Braunschweig, Germany between 9 and 14 July 2018.

Singles main-draw entrants

Seeds

 1 Rankings are as of 2 July 2018.

Other entrants
The following players received wildcards into the singles main draw:
  Thomaz Bellucci
  Nicola Kuhn
  Daniel Masur
  Rudolf Molleker

The following players received entry into the singles main draw as alternates:
  Martín Cuevas
  Arthur De Greef

The following players received entry from the qualifying draw:
  Kimmer Coppejans
  Maxime Janvier
  Marvin Netuschil
  Jan Šátral

The following player received entry as a lucky loser:
  Dragoș Dima

Champions

Singles

  Yannick Hanfmann def.  Jozef Kovalík 6–2, 3–6, 6–3.

Doubles

  Santiago González /  Wesley Koolhof def.  Sriram Balaji /  Vishnu Vardhan 6–3, 6–3.

External links
Official Website

2018 ATP Challenger Tour
2018
2018 in German tennis